Robert Matthews (1788–c. 1841) was an American carpenter, businessman, and religious figure who gathered a cult-like following in 1830s New York. His aliases included Robert Matthias, Jesus Matthias, Matthias the Prophet, and Joshua the Jewish Minister. Matthews successfully converted three wealthy businessmen who helped fund the founding of a settlement he called The Kingdom, in Sing Sing village, New York. The Kingdom, also known as Mount Zion, eventually became involved in adultery, bankruptcy, and suspected murder; consequently landing Matthews in jail. He is also remembered today for his brief encounter with Joseph Smith, the founder of the Latter Day Saint movement.

Life

Matthews was born in the farming village of Cambridge, in Washington County, New York, and was raised an Anti-Burgher Presbyterian. In 1795 both of his parents died, leaving him along with his four brothers and five sisters to the care of kin and neighbors. In 1806, Robert began learning carpentry and by 1808 had moved to Manhattan. After accusations of assault and battery on a female, possibly his sister-in-law, Robert returned to Cambridge and set up a successful business. During this time Matthews made occasional visits to New York City and met his wife Margaret, whom he married in 1813. Robert's business went bankrupt shortly thereafter and in 1825 he moved his family to Albany, where he again took up carpentry. It was during his time in Albany that Matthews received several visions naming him the descendent of the Apostle Matthias, and the receiver of the will of God, which he called "Truth." 

In 1830 he had a prophetic vision of a flood descending on Albany and fled the city fearing its destruction, abandoning his wife and four of his children after she refused to flee with him. Matthews took two of his sons in his escape and was wanted by Albany authorities for several weeks. He later returned his sons to Albany and went to New York City under the name Matthias, and visited Elijah Pierson a well known religious figure in Manhattan. Along with Pierson, Matthews succeeded in convincing wealthy merchants Sylvester Mills, and Benjamin Folger that he was the incarnation of God the Father and in exchange for "promised abundance in the kingdom of heaven" they funded his mission and signed over the deeds to two houses. A townhouse in Manhattan, and the Folgers residence in Sing Sing village. The Sing Sing estate, called Mount Zion, was home to the main operations of The Kingdom. Matthews ruled as the absolute patriarch over the estate, where he designated chores and tasks for the residents of his kingdom to complete. While at Mount Zion, Matthews controversially married himself to Anne Folger, citing Divine Will as justification for his adulterous affair with her. Reluctant to accept the situation, Folger went to Albany on orders of Matthews to retrieve his children. On the return trip from Albany, Folger engaged in sexual relations with Matthews oldest daughter Isabella Laisdell, who was married to Charles Laisdell. Upon discovering that Isabella and Benjamin were engaged in an affair, Matthews whipped her severely, but then joined them in marriage, approving the union. Isabella remained at Mount Zion for several weeks until her husband tracked her down and demanded she return to Albany. Folger was then married to another resident of The Kingdom, but tiring of Matthews, Benjamin Folger ordered him out of the house, and demanded his wife Anne back, a request which was refused. Around this time Elijah suffered from several health problems and, suddenly died under mysterious circumstances. Folger, determined to end Matthews' Kingdom had Matthews arrested and briefly incarcerated for obtaining money under false pretenses. 

In 1835 Matthews, along with his housekeeper Isabella (later known as Sojourner Truth), was accused of murdering Pierson, but was acquitted due to lack of evidence, and Truth's presentation of several letters verifying her trustworthiness as a servant. The trial then focused on the reported beating of his daughter which he was found guilty of. The trial which lasted four days, resulted in a sentencing of three months and thirty additional days for contempt of court. 

Upon his release from prison later in 1835, Matthews traveled through Ohio, and on 9 November of that year he paid a visit to Joseph Smith under the pseudonym "Joshua the Jewish Minister." The two discussed resurrection and reincarnation. Matthews claimed to be both God and the reincarnation of the apostle Matthias; he also said he was a literal descendant of Matthias, and that transmigration of the soul typically went from father to son. False rumors circulated that Matthews had joined the Mormons, but in fact his meeting with Smith ended with the two prophets denouncing each other as Satanic.

At one point, Matthews was committed to a hospital for the insane in New York. He is reported to have died in Iowa Territory in 1841.

Notes

References 
Paul E. Johnson and Sean Wilentz, The Kingdom of Matthias: A Story of Sex and Salvation in 19th-Century America, New York: Oxford University Press, 1994 Review.
William Leete Stone, Matthias and his Impostures- or, The Progress of Fanaticism (New York, 1835) Internet Archive online edition (pdf format, 16.9 MB, entire book on one pdf)
Gilbert Vale, Fanaticism - Its Source and Influence Illustrated by the Simple Narrative of Isabella, in the Case of Matthias, Mr. and Mrs. B. Folger, Mr. Pierson, Mr. Mills, Catherine, Isabella, &c. &c. (New York, 1835) Google Books online edition (pdf format, 9.9 MB, entire book on one pdf or one page per page)
"Robert Matthews", Joseph Smith Papers

1778 births
1841 deaths
American confidence tricksters
People acquitted of murder
1835 in religion
Businesspeople from New York City
People from Briarcliff Manor, New York
Prophets
People from Washington County, New York
Reincarnation